Camp Perry is a National Guard training facility located on the shore of Lake Erie in northern Ohio near Port Clinton. In addition to its regular mission as a military training base, Camp Perry also boasts the second largest outdoor rifle range in the world after the NRA Whittington Center in Raton, NM. The firing is done in the direction of the open water of the lake, that lies just beyond an earthen berm and the targets.

History
The original land for Camp Perry was purchased in 1906, and the reservation was named after Commodore Oliver Hazard Perry, the American naval commander who won the Battle of Put-in-Bay during the War of 1812. Rudimentary structures were constructed for use by competitors in the National Matches, and for transient military personnel. During World War I, Camp Perry served as a training center for Army officers and marksmanship instructors. Around 1918 an additional area immediately adjacent to the existing Camp Perry grounds was used to construct the Erie Army Depot for artillery ordnance storage.

During the Second World War, Camp Perry served as a POW camp for German and Italian prisoners. The Italian prisoners were very lightly guarded and worked alongside the civilians at the camp.  They were also used as workers at various local industries and returned to the camp each night.  The camp was used to test the longevity of artillery weapons. The gun barrels were measured with a very precise gauge.  The guns were then fired into Lake Erie and retested to determine the amount of wear the rounds of firing caused. This enabled the Army to estimate the effective life of the weapon.

After the war prisoner quarters were converted back to use by transient personnel who were at Perry for training. In 1946 the Governor of Ohio, Frank Lausche considered turning the camp into a college temporarily. The camp was used extensively for several years after World War II, but use slowed somewhat during the 1960s. The Erie Army Depot closed in the mid-1960s and was eventually converted to industrial use. However, many of Camp Perry's original structures are still in use in one form or another.  On June 24, 1998 a tornado damaged several buildings on the grounds.

Present use
Currently, Camp Perry is home to the 213th Ordnance Company (Missile Support, Corps), the 372d Missile Maintenance Company (DS) Detachment 1, the 200th RED HORSE Civil Engineering Squadron (Ohio Air National Guard), U.S. Coast Guard Port Security Unit 309, the Ohio Naval Militia (the naval arm of Ohio's State Defense Forces), and the Ohio Military Reserve (the militia arm of Ohio's State Defense Forces).

Civilian Marksmanship Program

Camp Perry has been the host of the Civilian Marksmanship Program (CMP) and the NRA-sponsored National Rifle Matches since 1907. The National Matches, considered America's "World Series of the Shooting Sports," attracts shooting sports competitors from all across the world to compete in matches of all multitudes. Competition event shooters range from beginners to the world’s best. The National Matches include Small Arms Firing Schools, a series of CMP National Trophy Rifle and Pistol Matches,  CMP Games Events and NRA national championships. The National Matches are conducted through a partnership with the CMP, the Ohio National Guard and the NRA.

The camp is home to the Small Arms Firing School, which provides shooters with expert training and facilities for improving their shooting ability. The Small Arms Firing School was first conducted by The Department of Defense as part of the National Matches at the camp in 1918. Now there are over one thousand pistol and rifle shooters a year that take part in firearms safety and fundamental marksmanship skills. The Pistol and Rifle Schools are conducted by the U. S. Army Marksmanship Unit (USAMU). The Schools are open to all United States citizens who are over the minimum age. USAMU instructors, assisted by Army, Air Force, Coast Guard, Marine Corps and Navy Active, National Guard and Army Reserve shooting team members teach basic marksmanship techniques to the  new and less experienced, and experienced shooters who want to learn new ways to improve their scores. Camp Perry is also home to the Civilian Marksmanship Program's north office.

See also 
 National Rifle Association of the United Kingdom
 Shooting sport
 Wimbledon Cup

References

External links

 Ohio Military Reserve 
 Long Range High Power at Camp Perry, Ohio

Installations of the United States Army National Guard
Military installations in Ohio
Buildings and structures in Ottawa County, Ohio
World War II prisoner of war camps in the United States
1909 establishments in Ohio